Saeid Abdollahnejad (born 7 October 1973) is an Iranian professional futsal coach and former player.

References

1973 births
Living people
Sportspeople from Tehran
Iranian men's futsal players
Shensa Saveh FSC players
Persepolis FSC players
Esteghlal FSC players
Iranian futsal coaches
Persepolis FSC managers